Jack Haig (born 6 September 1993) is an Australian professional road racing cyclist, who currently rides for UCI WorldTeam .

Career
He won the young rider classification in the 2014 Tour Down Under. He was named in the startlist for the 2016 Vuelta a España. In August 2017, he took his first professional win when he won stage 6 of the Tour de Pologne. In May 2018, he was named in the startlist for the 2018 Giro d'Italia. In July 2019, he was named in the startlist for the 2019 Tour de France.

Major results

2012
 Tour of Bright
1st Stages 2 & 3
2013
 1st  Cross-country, National Under-23 MTB Championships
 1st Overall Tour of Tasmania
1st Stage 1 (TTT)
 2nd Overall Tour of Toowoomba
1st Stage 3 (TTT)
 2nd Overall National Capital Tour
 3rd Road race, National Under-23 Road Championships
 3rd Overall North West Tour
1st Stage 1 (ITT)
 3rd Overall Tour of Bright
 3rd Tour de Perth
 7th Road race, Oceanian Road Championships
2014
 1st Overall Tour of Toowoomba
1st Stages 2 & 3 (TTT)
 1st  Young rider classification, Tour Down Under
 2nd Overall Tour Alsace
1st  Young rider classification
 3rd Overall Herald Sun Tour
1st  Young rider classification
 3rd Overall Tour de Korea
 4th GP Capodarco
 7th Gran Premio di Poggiana
2015
 2nd Overall Tour de l'Avenir
 2nd Gran Premio Palio del Recioto
 5th Overall Tour Alsace
 5th Gran Premio di Poggiana
 9th Overall Giro della Valle d'Aosta
 9th Chrono Champenois
2016
 2nd Overall Tour of Slovenia
1st  Points classification
 5th Overall Herald Sun Tour
2017
 3rd Overall Tour of Slovenia
 8th Overall Tour de Pologne
1st Stage 6
 9th Giro dell'Emilia
2018
 3rd Overall Tour of Utah
2019
 3rd Bretagne Classic
 3rd Gran Premio Bruno Beghelli
 4th Overall Paris–Nice
 5th Overall Czech Cycling Tour
1st Stage 1 (TTT)
 6th Overall Vuelta a Andalucía
 6th Giro di Lombardia
 7th Overall Volta a la Comunitat Valenciana
2020
 2nd Overall Vuelta a Andalucía
1st Stage 4
 2nd Overall Volta a la Comunitat Valenciana
 10th Overall Tirreno–Adriatico
2021
 3rd Overall Vuelta a España
 5th Overall Critérium du Dauphiné
 7th Overall Paris–Nice
 7th Overall Tour de la Provence
2022
 5th Overall Critérium du Dauphiné
 6th Overall Paris–Nice
 6th Overall Vuelta a Andalucía
2023
 10th Overall Paris–Nice

General classification results timeline

References

External links

1993 births
Living people
Australian male cyclists
Sportspeople from Bendigo